The Advisory Committee on Dangerous Pathogens (ACDP) is a UK-wide advisory committee. It was established in 1981, and the terms of reference were revised in 1991 to allow for a wider remit.

Description 
The terms of reference of the ACDP are:

"To provide as requested independent scientific advice to the Health and Safety Executive, and to Ministers through the Department of Health, the Department for Environment, Food and Rural Affairs, and their counterparts under devolution in Scotland, Wales and Northern Ireland, on all aspects of hazards and risks to workers and others from exposure to pathogens. In addition, to provide as requested independent scientific risk assessment advice on transmissible spongiform encephalopathies (TSEs) to Ministers through the Department of Health, the Department for Environment, Food and Rural Affairs, and their counterparts under devolution in Scotland, Wales and Northern Ireland and to the Food Standards Agency."

The Committee comprises a Chairman and up to 17 members. The membership includes scientific and medical experts, representing a range of disciplines.

On 31 December 2012, the Committee was reconstituted from an advisory non-departmental public body to an Expert Advisory Committee.

COVID-19 
From 19 March, Public Health England, consistent with the opinion of the Advisory Committee on Dangerous Pathogens, no longer classified COVID-19 as a "High consequence infectious disease" (HCID). This reversed an interim recommendation made in January 2020, due to more information about the disease confirming low overall mortality rates, greater clinical awareness, and a specific and sensitive laboratory test, the availability of which continues to increase. The statement said "the need to have a national, coordinated response remains" and added "this is being met by the government’s COVID-19 response". This meant cases of COVID-19 are no longer managed by HCID treatment centres only.

See also 
Joint Committee on Vaccination and Immunisation
New and Emerging Respiratory Virus Threats Advisory Group
Scientific Advisory Group for Emergencies

References

External links
ACDP home page

Safety organizations
Department of Health and Social Care
Occupational safety and health organizations